Turtle (DSV-3) was a 16-ton, crewed deep-ocean research submersible owned by the United States Navy. It is sister to Alvin (DSV-2) and Sea Cliff (DSV-4).

History

Turtle (DSV-3) was designed and built by the Electric Boat division of General Dynamics Corporation at Groton, Connecticut. Turtle and her sister Sea Cliff (DSV-4) were launched on December 11, 1968.  Turtle was named after Turtle Town, a small community in Polk County, Tennessee. Her name also pays tribute to the American submarine Turtle which served in the American Revolution.  Turtle was accepted by the US Navy on September 25, 1970 at Woods Hole, Massachusetts.

Turtle was designed to dive to 6500 feet. When DSV-2 Alvin installed a new titanium hull, the Alvin steel hull was installed in the Turtle. The original steel hull was acquired by the Mariners' Museum and Park in 2000 and became a part of the exhibition. The Turtle depth rating was then increased to 10,000 feet. The Alvin-class DSV's were designed to replace older DSV, such as the less maneuverable Trieste-class bathyscaphes.

Turtle spent her career as a unit of the U.S. Navy's Submarine Development Group 1 in San Diego, California.

The Turtle was retired from active service on October 1, 1997.  It was stricken from the US Navy Register on April 15, 1998.

It was on display at the Mystic Aquarium in Mystic, Connecticut.

Awards
Turtle earned one National Defense Service Medal in 1970. In addition to that she was awarded with the Navy Meritorious Unit Commendation (MUC) in 1982, 1983 and 1990.

In fiction
In fiction, she was featured in the 1980 film Raise the Titanic; she was one of several submersibles in the salvage fleet, and one of two (along with the fictional NUMA submersible Deep Quest) that actually discovered the wreck.

Alvin class DSV

 DSV Alvin (DSV-2)
 DSV Sea Cliff (DSV-4)
 Nemo (DSV-5)

See also

References

Citations

Bibliography
 Forman, Will. The History of American Deep Submersible Operations. Flagstaff: Best Publishing Company, 1999. .

External links

 
 DSV-3 Turtle page on navy.togetherweserved.com
 

Turtle
Research submarines of the United States
1968 ships